The powers and structure of the provincial Government of Manitoba  are set out in the Constitution Act, 1867.

In modern Canadian use, the term "government" referred broadly to the cabinet of the day (formally the Executive Council of Manitoba), elected from the Legislative Assembly of Manitoba and the non-political staff within each provincial department or agency – that is, the civil service.

The Province of Manitoba is governed by a unicameral legislature, the Legislative Assembly of Manitoba, which operates in the Westminster system of government. The political party that wins the largest number of seats in the legislature normally forms the government, and the party's leader becomes premier of the province, i.e., the head of the government.

Lieutenant-Governor of Manitoba 

The functions of the Sovereign, Charles III, King of Canada, known in Manitoba as the King in Right of Manitoba, are exercised by the Lieutenant Governor of Manitoba. The Lieutenant Governor is appointed by the Governor General of Canada on the recommendation of the Prime Minister of Canada, in consultation with the Premier of Manitoba.

Department 
Source:  
 Advanced Education and Training
 Agriculture
 Consumer Protection and Government Services 
 Economic Development, Investment and Trade
 Education and Early Childhood Learning
 Environment and Climate
 Families
 Francophone Affairs
 Status of Women
 Finance
 Health
 Indigenous Reconciliation and Northern Relations
 Intergovernmental Affairs
 Justice
 Labour and Immigration
 Mental Health and Community Wellness
 Municipal Relations
 Natural Resources and Northern Development
 Public Service Commission
 Seniors and Long term Care
 Sport, Culture and Heritage
 Transportation and Infrastructure

See also 
Politics of Manitoba
2019 Manitoba general election

References

External links
 Official Site